St Mary the Virgin's Church is in the village of Bottesford, Leicestershire, England. It is an active Anglican parish church in the deanery of Framland, the archdeaconry of Leicester and the diocese of Leicester. Its benefice is united with those of eight local parishes.  The church is recorded in the National Heritage List for England as a designated Grade I listed building.

History
Sometimes known as the "Lady of the Vale", it is a large church which has the 2nd highest spire in Leicestershire (at 212 feet). The oldest part of the church dates from the 12th century, with additions and alterations made during the following three centuries, including the nave and spire in the 15th century.  There are two gargoyles on the south transept. The chancel was rebuilt in the 17th century to accommodate the monuments of the Manners family, earls (later dukes) of Rutland, which completely fill it.  The monuments include work by Caius Gabriel Cibber and Gerard Johnson the elder. One of the Rutland tombs is famous for its inscription, which attributes two family deaths to witchcraft by the Witches of Belvoir.

A number of restorations were carried out during the 19th century.  The restoration in 1847–48 was carried out by the Lancaster partnership of Sharpe and Paley. This involved restoring the nave, aisles, and transepts, replacing the seating and the roofs of the aisles, removing the gallery, inserting the tower screen, adding new pinnacles, reflooring the church and replacing windows. This cost £2,235 (equivalent to £ in ), towards which the Duke of Rutland gave £600, the Revd F. J. Norman gave £550, and a grant of £110 was received from the Incorporated Church Building Society.

A headstone to Thomas Parker and a table tomb in the churchyard are both Grade II listed, as are the gate piers and gates to the churchyard to the north. The churchyard contains war graves of fifteen Commonwealth service (mainly Royal Air Force) personnel, five from the First World War and ten from the Second World War.

Rectors of Bottesford

Raph de Albiniaco 1223
Nicholas de Belvoir 1234 - 1273
Peter de Ros 1273 - 1289
William de Filungele 1289 - 1325
Gilbert de Wyggeton until 1332
Sir Adam de Staynegrave from 1332
Henry de Codyngton 1374 - 1404
John Freeman 1420
Robert Jackson 
William Constable 
John Whittinge 1558
Robert Cressey 1560
Samuel Fleming 1581 - 1620
Francis Allen 1621
Richus Langham 1624
Anthony Marshall 1662 - 1679
Thomas White 1679 - 1685
Caradocus Creed 1685
Abel Ligonier 1698 - 1710
Lewis Griffin 1711 - 1735
Bernard Wilson 1735 (presented but never took possession)
John Ewer 1735 - 1753
Richard Stevens 1753 - 1771
George Turner 1771 - 1782
Sir John Thoroton 1782 - 1820
Charles Roos Thornton 1821 - 1846 
Canon Frederick John Norman 1846 – 1889 
Canon Robert Manners Norman 1889 – 1895
William Vincent-Jackson 1895 - 1917
Frank Walford 1918 – 1943
Canon Alfred Thomas Gardner Blackmore 1943 – 1958 
Canon William Nelson Metcalfe 1959 – 1982 
Kenneth Aubrey Dyke 1982 – 1992 
Geoffrey Spencer 1993 – 1998 
Charles Bradshaw 1999 – 2004 
Stuart J. Foster 2005 – 2009

Organ
A pipe organ was built by Forster and Andrews and opened on 11 October 1859 by Henry Farmer. It was modified by Wadsworth in 1892. In 1995 Norman Hall and Sons installed a second-hand organ by T.C. Lewis from St Hugh’s Church, Southwark. It comprises 2 manuals and pedals and has 15 speaking stops.

Organists
James Moore 1859 - 1908 (blind)
Professor Samuel Corbett 1910 - 1912 (blind)
Fred W. Carter 1926 - 1971
Paul Willcock
Chris Coe

Burials
Thomas Manners, 1st Earl of Rutland
Eleanor Paston, Countess of Rutland
Henry Manners, 2nd Earl of Rutland and his wife Margaret Neville (d. 13 October 1559)
Edward Manners, 3rd Earl of Rutland and his wife Isabel Holcroft
John Manners, 4th Earl of Rutland and his wife Elizabeth Charlton, daughter of Francis Charlton of Apley Castle
Roger Manners, 5th Earl of Rutland and his wife Elizabeth Sidney, daughter of Sir Philip Sidney 
Francis Manners, 6th Earl of Rutland
George Manners, 7th Earl of Rutland
John Manners, 8th Earl of Rutland and his wife Lady Frances Montagu Manners
Elizabeth Manners, Duchess of Rutland in the family vault

See also
List of works by Sharpe and Paley
Treasure Houses of Britain – 1985 TV documentary that opens at the church

References

Church of England church buildings in Leicestershire
Grade I listed churches in Leicestershire
English Gothic architecture in Leicestershire
Sharpe and Paley buildings
Burial sites of the Manners family